Methylecgonone reductase (MecgoR (gene name)) is an enzyme with systematic name ecgonine methyl ester:NADP+ oxidoreductase. This enzyme catalyses the following chemical reaction

 ecgonine methyl ester + NADP+  ecgonone methyl ester + NADPH + H+

The enzyme from the plant Erythroxylum coca participates in the biosynthesis of cocaine.

References

External links 
 

EC 1.1.1